"Tunnel Vision" is a single by American rapper Kodak Black. It is the second single from his debut studio album, Painting Pictures (2017). The song was released on February 17, 2017 by Dollaz N Dealz Entertainment, Sniper Gang, and Atlantic Records. The track was produced by Metro Boomin, Southside, and Cubeatz. It has peaked at number six on the US Billboard Hot 100. The track samples the song "El Aparecido" by Inti-Illimani, a Chilean folk band, part of the Nueva canción movement.

Background
Kodak Black was released from a jail in South Carolina on bail following a rape case which he was accused of, a couple weeks prior to the recording of the song. Kodak Black released a preview of the song on his Instagram account when he was in the studio with Metro Boomin in Miami, Florida, and it gained millions of plays before its official release two months after.

Music video
The song's accompanying music video premiered a day before the song was released as single, on February 16, 2017 on Kodak Black's YouTube account. The music video currently has over 300 million views. In the video, a white man wearing a Confederate flag jacket and a "Make America Hate Again" hat arrives at a "hunting ground" where a black man is working on a farm. The white man tries to fire a gun at the black man, but the gun malfunctions. The black man attempts to choke the white man, until a young girl tells them to stop. There is a Ku Klux Klan member hanging from a cross in the background.

Commercial performance
"Tunnel Vision" debuted at number 27 on US Billboard Hot 100 for the chart dated March 12, 2017. The following week, it entered the top 10, moving up to number eight; it has since peaked at number six. It is Kodak Black's first top 10 single. In March 2017, the song was certified Gold by the Recording Industry Association of America (RIAA) for earning 500,000 equivalent units in the United States, a month and a half after its initial release. On June 30, 2017, "Tunnel Vision" was certified as double platinum by the RIAA.

Reception
Matthew Pulver of Salon compared the song's music video to Snoop Dogg's "Lavender (Nightfall Remix)" music video. Pulver praised Kodak's video, writing, "The Jim Crow-era imagery combines with slave-era servitude and contemporary Trumpism to construct a critique of the current crisis that stretches through generations to link it to the centuries-long national history of anti-black violence and oppression."

Lyrical references
Kodak Black played the original recording of the full song at some of his concerts, which included the following lyrics:

<poem>
I jumped out of that Wraith, Kodak bought a Wraith
I get any girl I want, I don't gotta rape</poem>

This was a reference to Kodak Black's pending criminal charges of rape in South Carolina. The reference was removed in the final version of the song.

Other references to Kodak Black's legal troubles include the lyric: "Lil' Kodak they don't wanna see you winnin', they just wanna see you in the penitentiary."

Charts

Weekly charts

Year-end charts

Certifications

References

2017 singles
2017 songs
Kodak Black songs
Atlantic Records singles
Songs written by Kodak Black
Songs written by Metro Boomin
Songs written by Southside (record producer)
Song recordings produced by Metro Boomin
Song recordings produced by Southside (record producer)
Song recordings produced by Cubeatz
Songs written by Kevin Gomringer
Songs written by Tim Gomringer
Trap music songs